The 2013–14 Louisiana-Monroe Warhawks women's basketball team represents the University of Louisiana at Monroe during the 2013–14 NCAA Division I women's basketball season. The Warhawks, led by 19th year head coach Mona Matin. The Warhawks play their home games at the Fant–Ewing Coliseum and are members of the Sun Belt Conference.

Roster

Schedule

|-
!colspan=9| Regular Season

|-
!colspan=9| Conference Schedule 

|-
!colspan=9| 2014 Sun Belt Conference Tournament

See also
2013–14 Louisiana–Monroe Warhawks men's basketball team

References

Louisiana–Monroe Warhawks women's basketball seasons
Louisiana-Monroe
Louisiana–Monroe
Louisiana–Monroe